Tarita Cheyenne Brando (20 February 1970 – 16 April 1995) was a French fashion model. She was the daughter of actor Marlon Brando by his third wife Tarita Teriipaia, an actress from French Polynesia whom he met while filming Mutiny on the Bounty in 1962.

Early life
Born in 1970, Brando was raised by her mother Tarita on the island of Tahiti, south of Papeete. Her parents divorced in 1972.

While growing up, Marlon Brando did not allow Cheyenne and her brother Tehotu to visit him in the United States. In 1976 he stated, "I don't think I will let them [Cheyenne and Tehotu] go to the States. As Tahitians, they are too trusting. They would be destroyed in the pace of life in the States." As a child, Cheyenne reportedly adored her father and bragged about him. As she entered her teenage years, her feelings towards her father changed. In a 1990 interview she stated, "I have come to despise my father for the way he ignored me when I was a child. He came to the island maybe once a year but really didn't seem to care whether he saw me or not. He wanted us but he didn't want us."

Cheyenne eventually dropped out of high school and began taking drugs including LSD, PCP, marijuana, and tranquilizers. During this time, she began a modeling career.

In 1989, Cheyenne was seriously injured in a car accident when she crashed a Jeep she was driving after her father refused to allow her to visit him while he was filming The Freshman in Toronto. She sustained a broken jaw, a laceration under her eye, and a torn ear. Marlon Brando flew Cheyenne to Los Angeles to undergo extensive reconstructive and cosmetic surgery. The accident effectively ended her modeling career. After the accident, she began experiencing bouts of depression and attempted suicide.

Death of Dag Drollet
In May 1987, Cheyenne began dating 23-year-old Dag Drollet. His father, Jacques Drollet, was a member of the Assembly of French Polynesia. The pair were introduced through a get-together, as the Brandos and Drollets had been longtime friends. In 1989, Cheyenne became pregnant with their child. At Marlon Brando's request, the couple moved to the United States and into Marlon's Mulholland Drive home to await the birth of their child.

On 16 May 1990, Drollet was fatally shot by Cheyenne's elder half-brother Christian at their father's home. Christian Brando maintained that the shooting was accidental. He stated that earlier in the evening, Cheyenne told him that Drollet was physically abusing her. Later that night, Christian confronted Drollet about the abuse. Christian claimed that the gun went off after Drollet tried to take the gun away from him.

Christian Brando was immediately arrested and charged with first-degree murder two days later. The prosecutors of the case attempted to subpoena Cheyenne to testify at Christian's trial as they felt her account of the night's event was crucial in proving the shooting was premeditated. However, she refused to testify and fled to Tahiti. On 26 June 1990, she gave birth to a son she named Tuki Brando. Soon after Tuki's birth, Cheyenne attempted suicide twice and was hospitalized for drug detoxification in a psychiatric hospital. On 22 December 1990, Cheyenne was declared "mentally disabled" by a French judge and was deemed unable to testify in her brother's trial.

Without Cheyenne's testimony, prosecutors felt they could no longer prove that Drollet's death was premeditated. They presented Christian Brando with a plea deal. Christian took the deal and pleaded guilty to the lesser charge of voluntary manslaughter. He was sentenced to ten years in prison. He served a total of five years and was placed on three years' probation. In an interview given after his release, Christian stated that he doubted Cheyenne's accusations of physical abuse against Drollet due to her mental instability. "I feel like a complete chump for believing her," he said.

Aftermath and final years
In the years following Drollet's death and her half-brother Christian's trial, Cheyenne's mental health steadily declined. She repeatedly entered drug rehab and psychiatric hospitals. Cheyenne also publicly accused her father of molesting her and accused him of being an accomplice in Drollet's death; Marlon Brando denied both accusations.

Cheyenne was later formally diagnosed with schizophrenia, became isolated from her former friends, and ultimately lost custody of her son, Tuki, to her mother, who raised him in Tahiti. As an adult, Tuki Brando entered medical school and, like his mother, would go into modeling.

Death
On 16 April 1995, Cheyenne shot herself at her mother's house in Puna'auia, Tahiti. Neither her father nor her half-brother Christian were able to attend her funeral in Tahiti. She was buried in the Roman Catholic Uranie Cemetery in Papeete in the family crypt of Dag Drollet's family.

References

1970 births
1995 deaths
French female models
French Polynesian people of American descent
French Polynesian people of Chinese descent
Brando family
People from Tahiti
People with schizophrenia
Suicides by hanging in France
Suicides in French Polynesia
Tahitian women
1995 suicides
20th-century French women